Vorschmack or forshmak (from archaic German Vorschmack, "foretaste" or "appetizer") is an originally East European dish made of salty minced fish or meat. Different variants of this dish are especially common in Ashkenazi Jewish and Finnish cuisine. Some varieties are also known in  Ukrainian, Polish and Russian cuisine.

In Jewish cuisine 
According to Gil Marks, the German name points to the possible German origin of this dish. William Pokhlyobkin describes it as an originally East Prussian hot appetizer which was made of fried herring. The dish was adopted and brought eastwards by Ashkenazi Jews which transformed it into a cold appetizer, a pâté made of chopped brined herring. While the name forshmak became common in Ukraine, Polish and Lithuanian Jews usually called it gehakte herring ("chopped herring").

Traditional recipes include chopped hard-boiled egg, onion and grated fresh apple. Sometimes potatoes are also added. The appetizer is usually served as a salad or as a spread on bread, crackers or kichlach (cookies). It may also be eaten for breakfast or as a main course, usually with boiled potatoes.

In Russian cuisine 

Although nowadays vorschmack is mainly associated with Jewish cuisine in Russia, historically different versions of this dish were known there. These were usually hot zakuski (appetizers) or breakfast dishes. A Gift to Young Housewives, a classical Russian cookbook by Elena Molokhovets, provides three recipes of hot vorschmack in its first edition (1861) and further variants were added in subsequent editions. In one recipe, meat (veal or beef), herring, white bread and onions are minced, mixed with smetana (sour cream) or cream and baked. Other recipes include only herring (without meat), as well as other ingredients, such as potatoes, eggs and apples. Even more elaborate recipes with further details on cooking techniques are given in another classical Russian cookery textbook, The Practical Fundamentals of the Cookery Art (1899–1916) by Pelageya Alexandrova-Ignatieva. It was in particular proposed to place the mixture of minced ingredients inside a kalach, cover it with grated cheese and bake it au gratin. Similar recipes also appear in Cookery (1955), a major cookbook of Soviet cuisine.

In Polish cuisine 
As a cold pâté or a hot baked appetizer, various recipes of forszmak (the same pronunciation) are found in old Polish cookery. The recipes are similar to the Russian ones described above. Another variety, a meat stew named forszmak lubelski is known in East Poland (Lublin region), usually made of chopped meat (beef, pork, or chicken), pickled cucumbers, and tomato paste.

In Finnish cuisine 

In Finnish cuisine, vorschmack is usually prepared out of ground meat, anchovies or herring and onions. The dish is usually garnished with potatoes, pickles and smetana (sour cream). Snaps is usually served in combination with eating vorschmack. Some recipes include cognac.

There are several stories regarding the origin of the dish, but it has become a traditional Finnish dish as it was one of the favourite appetizers of the Finnish president, statesman, war hero and gourmand Marshall Gustaf Mannerheim. Some sources say Mannerheim brought the dish to Finland from Poland or Russia, but there have not been any definite sources for these claims.

The restaurant Savoy at the top floor of one of the buildings around the Esplanadi in central Helsinki is famous for its vorschmack. The restaurant used to be frequented by Mannerheim and Mannerheim's table at the Savoy was always reserved and, out of respect, no one would ever consider demanding to be seated there. Savoy still today keeps a similar style decor and menu as in the days of Mannerheim.

See also 

 Chopped liver
 Gefilte fish

References

Ashkenazi Jewish cuisine
Shabbat food
Ukrainian cuisine
Finnish cuisine
Russian cuisine
Appetizers
Herring dishes
Spreads (food)